The Clinic for Special Children (CSC) is a primary pediatric care and gene research clinic located in Strasburg, Pennsylvania. The facility specializes in genetic problems of the plain sects, such as the Amish and Old Order Mennonites. It was founded in 1989.  The most common genetic disorders treated by the Clinic are glutaric acidemia type I (GA1), which is common in the Amish population and maple syrup urine disease (MSUD), which has a high prevalence in the Old Order Mennonites.

Establishment
The Clinic for Special Children was founded by the Plain community with Dr. D. Holmes Morton and his wife, Caroline in 1989.   The clinic building was raised by the Plain community and completed in 1990 while an addition was added in 2000.  In addition to patient care facilities, the Clinic also houses its own laboratories, providing rapid biochemical and molecular genetic testing. The Clinic sees over 1,100 active patients and performs about 4,000 biochemical and genetic tests each year.

References

External links
 Official site
 Genomics in Amish Country
 Scientists discover genetic defect responsible for devastating brain disorder among Amish babies

Amish in Pennsylvania